A designated place is a type of geographic unit used by Statistics Canada to disseminate census data. It is usually "a small community that does not meet the criteria used to define incorporated municipalities or Statistics Canada population centres (areas with a population of at least 1,000 and no fewer than 400 persons per square kilometre)." Provincial and territorial authorities collaborate with Statistics Canada in the creation of designated places so that data can be published for sub-areas within municipalities. Starting in 2016, Statistics Canada allowed the overlapping of designated places with population centres.

In the 2021 Census of Population, Quebec had 120 designated places, an increase from 117 in 2016. Designated place types in Quebec include 14 retired population centres, 94 dissolved municipalities (municipalité dissoute), and 12 unconstituted localities (localité non constituée). Quebec's largest designated place is Sainte-Agathe-des-Monts with a population of 6,740.


List

See also 
List of census agglomerations in Quebec
List of population centres in Quebec
List of unconstituted localities in Quebec
Municipal history of Quebec

References 

Lists of populated places in Quebec